Heinz in the Moon is a 1934 German comedy film directed by Robert A. Stemmle and starring Heinz Rühmann, Rudolf Platte and Annemarie Sörensen. It was shot at the Halensee Studios in Berlin. The film's sets were designed by the art director Franz Schroedter. Stemmle renamed the title from Hans to Heinz to take advantage of the star's popularity.

Cast
 Heinz Rühmann as Aristides Nessel
 Rudolf Platte as Arthur Kosemund, Nessels Diener
 Annemarie Sörensen as Anna Busch, Privatsekretärin
 Oskar Sima as Martin Fasan, Börsenmakler
 Erika Glässner as Helene Fasan
 Ellen Frank as Siddie Fasan
 Anita Mey as Dina, Dienstmädchen bei Fasan
 Hans Leibelt as Professor Ass
 Susi Lanner as Cleo Ass
 Inge Conradi as Corinna Linck
 Alexa von Porembsky as Emma, Dienstmädchen von Ass
 Julia Serda as Frau Bach
 Fita Benkhoff a sMadame Pythia
 Dodo van Doeren
 Friedrich Ettel
 Ernst Nessler
 Max Wilmsen
 Josef Dahmen
 Walter Steinweg
 Carl Walther Meyer
 Hans Albin

References

Bibliography

External links 
 

1934 films
Films of Nazi Germany
German comedy films
1934 comedy films
1930s German-language films
Films directed by Robert A. Stemmle
Tobis Film films
German black-and-white films
Films shot at Halensee Studios
Films based on French novels
1930s German films